Orthophytum foliosum is a plant species in the genus Orthophytum. This species is endemic to Brazil.

References

foliosum
Flora of Brazil